Zichron Menachem ("Memorial for Menachem") is the Israeli nonprofit organization for the support of children with cancer and their families. It offers immediate, practical and long-term solutions to the wide range of problems that must be overcome from the moment that a child has been diagnosed with cancer. It also provides support to children who have a parent living with cancer.  The organization is headquartered in Jerusalem and operates in all major Israeli hospitals with pediatric oncology/hematology wards.

History 
Menachem Ehrental was an Israeli boy who battled cancer from the age of 2 until his death at age 15. Menachem's parents, Chaim and Miri Ehrental founded Zichron Menachem as a nonprofit organization with the mission of easing the suffering of young cancer patients and their families.

By 2006, Zichron Menachem has helped thousands of children and families. It has an extensive network of hundreds of professionally trained volunteers in every part of Israel.

Programs 
All Zichron Menachem programs, activities and facilities are offered free-of-charge to children stricken with cancer, and their families, regardless of their religion, ethnic origin or socio-economic status.

Its programs include:
 Support groups for parents, bereaved parents and children
 Big brothers and big sisters
 Permanent hospital staffing
 Three annual adventure camps
 Weekly parties
 Fun days
 Reservoir of blood products
 Guesthouse
 Hair wigs for cancer patients, made from hair donated by volunteers
 Lending library
 Psycho-social and professional support
 Advocacy

Day center 
The Zichron Menachem Day Center in Jerusalem is an educational, recreational and rehabilitation center dedicated for the exclusive use of children with cancer and their families. Many of these children have suppressed immune systems due to chemotherapy, and in order to protect their already fragile health, they cannot always attend school and social events. The center offers these children a clean environment where they continue their studies, undergo specific therapies and enjoy a wide range of fun and entertaining activities. Music, computers, art, rocketry, sports, photography and journalism are but a few of the many extracurricular activities offered to the children. The Day Center offers these same activities to the sick child’s brothers and sisters during the afternoon and early evening hours.

Awards 
In recognition of its humanitarian activities, Zichron Menachem has been awarded with awards, including:
 Israel President's Prize for Volunteers
 Israel Prime Minister's Child Protector Award
 Israel Health Minister's Prize for Volunteers (2000, Chaim and Miri Ehrental, 2006, Zohar Hala)
 The Mayor of Jerusalem’s Citation for Volunteers
 Order of Orange-Nassau Knight's Medal from Queen Beatrix (I) of the Netherlands (Mrs. Borie Maarsen)

Organization 
Zichron Menachem is a registered nonprofit, charitable organization in Israel, the USA, and the United Kingdom. Friends of Zichron Menachem organizations and committees in the USA ('The Children's Bridge of Zichron Menachem'), UK, and Europe help support Zichron Menachem's programs, activities and facilities.

References

External links

Cancer organizations based in Israel
Charities based in Israel
Volunteer organizations in Israel